Gelora Bumi Kartini Stadium (Stadion Gelora Bumi Kartini) is a multi-use stadium in Jepara, Indonesia.  It is used mostly for football matches.  The stadium holds 20,000 people.

References 

Buildings and structures in Central Java
Sports venues in Indonesia
Football venues in Indonesia
Athletics (track and field) venues in Indonesia
Multi-purpose stadiums in Indonesia
Football venues in Central Java
Athletics (track and field) venues in Central Java
Multi-purpose stadiums in Central Java